The 1954 World Table Tennis Championships – Corbillon Cup (women's team) was the 14th edition of the women's team championship. 

Japan won the gold medal, Hungary won the silver medal and England won the bronze medal following a three way tie in the final group play off, positions of which were eventually decided by matches won.

Medalists

Final tables

Group A

Group B

+withdrew

Group C

+ withdrew

Final group

Final group matches

See also
List of World Table Tennis Championships medalists

References

-
1954 in women's table tennis